Mats Jonas Eriksson (born 1967) is a Swedish politician, teacher and former member of the Riksdag, the national legislature. A member of the Green Party, he represented Örebro County between October 2010 and November 2019. He was leader of the Green Group in the Riksdag five times: January 2015 to March 2015; May 2015 to December 2015; November 2016 to January 2018; September 2018 to February 2019; and July 2019 to November 2019.

Eriksson is the son of businessman Roger Eriksson and nurse Bodil Eriksson (née Danielsson). He was educated in Örebro and has degrees in mathematics, physics and religion; business administration and law; and teaching. He was a teacher in Lindesberg Municipality from 1989 to 1996 and in Örebro Municipality from 1998 to 2007.

References

1967 births
Living people
Members of the Riksdag 2010–2014
Members of the Riksdag 2014–2018
Members of the Riksdag 2018–2022
Members of the Riksdag from the Green Party
People from Örebro
Swedish schoolteachers